Seewen may refer to
 Seewen, Solothurn, a municipality in the canton of Solothurn, Switzerland
 Seewen, Schwyz, a village in the municipality of Schwyz in the canton of Schwyz, Switzerland